Bhilai Nagar is one of the 90 Legislative Assembly constituencies of Chhattisgarh state in India. It is in Durg district.

Members of the Legislative Assembly

Election results

2018

See also
List of constituencies of the Chhattisgarh Legislative Assembly
Durg district

References

Durg district
Assembly constituencies of Chhattisgarh